Friedrich Christian may refer to:

 August Friedrich Christian Vilmar (1800–1868), German Neo-Lutheran theologian
 Carl Friedrich Christian Fasch (1736–1800), German composer and harpsichordist
 Carl Friedrich Christian Mohs (1773–1839), German geologist and mineralogist
 Frederick Christian II, Duke of Schleswig-Holstein-Sonderburg-Augustenburg (1765–1814), Danish prince and feudal magnate
 Friedrich Christian Anton Lang (1890–1976), German-Austrian filmmaker
 Friedrich Christian Baumeister (1709–1785), German philosopher
 Friedrich Christian Bressand (c. 1670 – 1699), Baroque German poet
 Friedrich Christian Delius (born 1943), German writer
 Friedrich Christian Diez (1794–1876), German philologist
 Friedrich Christian Flick (born 1944), German-Swiss art collector
 Friedrich Christian Glume (1714–1752), German artist
 Friedrich Christian Gregor Wernekinck (1798–1835), German anatomist
 Friedrich Christian Hermann Uber (1781–1822), German composer
 Friedrich Christian Laukhard (1757–1822), German novelist, philosopher, historian and theologian
 Friedrich Christian Meuschen (1719–1811), German diplomat
 Friedrich Christian Rosenthal (1780–1829), German anatomist
 Friedrich Christian Weber (18th century), German diplomat and writer
 Friedrich Christian, Count of Schaumburg-Lippe (1655–1728), second ruler of the County of Schaumburg-Lippe
 Friedrich Christian, Margrave of Meissen (1893–1968), head of the Royal House of Saxony

See also

 Christian Friedrich (disambiguation)
 Christian Frederick (disambiguation)